The Court of Appeal (lit. National Court) is an appellate court with appellate jurisdiction over all district court cases. The court was established by the Courts Act of 2016 and began operating 1 January 2018. The establishment introduced a three-tier judiciary in Iceland where before operated only district courts and the Supreme Court since the 1919 abolition of the National High Court.

The court is composed of fifteen justices selected by the Qualifications Committee and nominated by the Minister of Justice for presidential confirmation. In cases where the minister wishes to make changes to the committee's selection, Parliament must approve of said changes with a simple majority vote.

References

External links
Official website 

Courts in Iceland
Organizations established in 2016
2016 establishments in Iceland